South of Conant is a neighborhood located in Long Beach, California that lies just north of Spring Street, south of Conant Street, east of Clark Avenue, and west of Woodruff Avenue; and includes Wardlow Park. It is known for its LGBTQ+ community.

References

Neighborhoods in Long Beach, California